XHTPC-FM is a noncommercial radio station on 106.7 FM in Tapachula, Chiapas, Mexico. It is owned by Simón Valanci and is known as Bella Música.

History
XHTPC received its permit on November 1, 2011.

References

2011 establishments in Mexico
Radio stations established in 2011
Radio stations in Chiapas
Spanish-language radio stations